Gravimetric analysis describes a set of methods used in analytical chemistry for the quantitative determination of an analyte (the ion being analyzed) based on its mass. The principle of this type of analysis is that once an ion's mass has been determined as a unique compound, that known measurement can then be used to determine the same analyte's mass in a mixture, as long as the relative quantities of the other constituents are known.

The four main types of this method of analysis are precipitation, volatilization, electro-analytical and miscellaneous physical method. The methods involve changing the phase of the analyte to separate it in its pure form from the original mixture and are quantitative measurements.

Precipitation method

The precipitation method is the one used for the determination of the amount of calcium in water. Using this method, an excess of oxalic acid, H2C2O4, is added to a measured, known volume of water. By adding a reagent, here ammonium oxalate, the calcium will precipitate as calcium oxalate. The proper reagent, when added to aqueous solution, will produce highly insoluble precipitates from the positive and negative ions that would otherwise be soluble with their counterparts (equation 1).

The reaction is:

Formation of calcium oxalate:

Ca2+(aq) + C2O42- → CaC2O4

The precipitate is collected, dried and ignited to high (red) heat which converts it entirely to calcium oxide.

The reaction is pure calcium oxide formed

CaC2O4 → CaO(s) + CO(g)+ CO2(g)

The pure precipitate is cooled, then measured by weighing, and the difference in weights before and after reveals the mass of analyte lost, in this case calcium oxide. That number can then be used to calculate the amount, or the percent concentration, of it in the original mix.

Volatilization methods

Volatilization methods can be either direct or indirect. Water eliminated in a quantitative manner from many inorganic substances by ignition is an example of a direct determination. It is collected on a solid desiccant and its mass determined by the gain in mass of the desiccant.

Another direct volatilization method involves carbonates which generally decompose to release carbon dioxide when acids are used. Because carbon dioxide is easily evolved when heat is applied, its mass is directly established by the measured increase in the mass of the absorbent solid used.

Determination of the amount of water by measuring the loss in mass of the sample during heating is an example of an indirect method. It is well known that changes in mass occur due to decomposition of many substances when heat is applied, regardless of the presence or absence of water. Because one must make the assumption that water was the only component lost, this method is less satisfactory than direct methods.

This often fault and misleading assumption has proven to be wrong on more than a few occasions. There are many substances other than water loss that can lead to loss of mass with the addition of heat, as well as a number of other factors that may contribute to it. The widened margin of error created by this all-too-often false assumption is not one to be lightly disregarded as the consequences could be far-reaching.

Nevertheless, the indirect method, although less reliable than direct, is still widely used in commerce. For example, it's used to measure the moisture content of cereals, where a number of imprecise and inaccurate instruments are available for this purpose.

Types of volatilization methods 
In volatilization methods, removal of the analyte involves separation by heating or chemically decomposing a volatile sample at a suitable temperature. In other words, thermal or chemical energy is used to precipitate a volatile species. For example, the water content of a compound can be determined by vaporizing the water using thermal energy (heat). Heat can also be used, if oxygen is present, for combustion to isolate the suspect species and obtain the desired results.

The two most common gravimetric methods using volatilization are those for water and carbon dioxide. An example of this method is the isolation of sodium hydrogen bicarbonate (the main ingredient in most antacid tablets) from a mixture of carbonate and bicarbonate.  The total amount of this analyte, in whatever form, is obtained by addition of an excess of dilute sulfuric acid to the analyte in solution.

In this reaction, nitrogen gas is introduced through a tube into the flask which contains the solution. As it passes through, it gently bubbles. The gas then exits, first passing a drying agent (here CaSO4, the common desiccant Drierite). It then passes a mixture of the drying agent and sodium hydroxide which lies on asbestos or Ascarite II, a non-fibrous silicate containing sodium hydroxide. The mass of the carbon dioxide is obtained by measuring the increase in mass of this absorbent.  This is performed by measuring the difference in weight of the tube in which the ascarite contained before and after the procedure.

The calcium sulfate (CaSO4) in the tube retains carbon dioxide selectively as it's heated, and thereby, removed from the solution. The drying agent absorbs any aerosolized water and/or water vapor (reaction 3.). The mix of the drying agent and NaOH absorbs the CO2 and any water that may have been produced as a result of the absorption of the NaOH (reaction 4.).

The reactions are:

Reaction 3 - absorption of water

NaHCO3(aq) + H2SO4(aq) → CO2(g) + H2O(l) + NaHSO4(aq).

Reaction 4. Absorption of CO2 and residual water

CO2(g) + 2 NaOH(s)  → Na2CO3(s) + H2O(l).

Procedure

The sample is dissolved, if it is not already in solution.
The solution may be treated to adjust the pH (so that the proper precipitate is formed, or to suppress the formation of other precipitates).  If it is known that species are present which interfere (by also forming precipitates under the same conditions as the analyte), the sample might require treatment with a different reagent to remove these interferents.
The precipitating reagent is added at a concentration that favors the formation of a "good" precipitate (see below).  This may require low concentration, extensive heating (often described as "digestion"), or careful control of the pH. Digestion can help reduce the amount of coprecipitation.
After the precipitate has formed and been allowed to "digest", the solution is carefully filtered.  The filter is used to collect the precipitate; smaller particles are more difficult to filter.
Depending on the procedure followed, the filter might be a piece of ashless filter paper in a fluted funnel, or a filter crucible.  Filter paper is convenient because it does not typically require cleaning before use; however, filter paper can be chemically attacked by some solutions (such as concentrated acid or base), and may tear during the filtration of large volumes of solution.
The alternative is a crucible whose bottom is made of some porous material, such as sintered glass, porcelain or sometimes metal.  These are chemically inert and mechanically stable, even at elevated temperatures.  However, they must be carefully cleaned to minimize contamination or carryover(cross-contamination).  Crucibles are often used with a mat of glass or asbestos fibers to trap small particles.
After the solution has been filtered, it should be tested to make sure that the analyte has been completely precipitated.  This is easily done by adding a few drops of the precipitating reagent; if a precipitate is observed, the precipitation is incomplete.
After filtration, the precipitate – including the filter paper or crucible – is heated, or charred.  This accomplishes the following:
The remaining moisture is removed (drying).
Secondly, the precipitate is converted to a more chemically stable form.  For instance, calcium ion might be precipitated using oxalate ion, to produce calcium oxalate (CaC2O4); it might then be heated to convert it into the oxide (CaO).  It is vital that the empirical formula of the weighed precipitate be known, and that the precipitate be pure; if two forms are present, the results will be inaccurate.
The precipitate cannot be weighed with the necessary accuracy in place on the filter paper; nor can the precipitate be completely removed from the filter paper to weigh it.  The precipitate can be carefully heated in a crucible until the filter paper has burned away; this leaves only the precipitate.  (As the name suggests, "ashless" paper is used so that the precipitate is not contaminated with ash.)
After the precipitate is allowed to cool (preferably in a desiccator to keep it from absorbing moisture), it is weighed (in the crucible). To calculate the final mass of the analyte, the starting mass of the empty crucible is subtracted from the final mass of the crucible containing the sample. Since the composition of the precipitate is known, it is simple to calculate the mass of analyte in the original sample.

Example

A chunk of ore is to be analyzed for sulfur content. It is treated with concentrated nitric acid and potassium chlorate to convert all of the sulfur to sulfate (SO).  The nitrate and chlorate are removed by treating the solution with concentrated HCl.  The sulfate is precipitated with barium (Ba2+) and weighed as BaSO4.

Advantages

Gravimetric analysis, if methods are followed carefully, provides for exceedingly precise analysis. In fact, gravimetric analysis was used to determine the atomic masses of many elements in the periodic table to six figure accuracy. Gravimetry provides very little room for instrumental error and does not require a series of standards for calculation of an unknown. Also, methods often do not require expensive equipment. Gravimetric analysis, due to its high degree of accuracy, when performed correctly, can also be used to calibrate other instruments in lieu of reference standards. Gravimetric analysis is currently used to allow undergraduate chemistry/Biochemistry students to  experience a grad level laboratory and it is a highly effective teaching tool to those who want to attend medical school or any research graduate school.

Disadvantages

Gravimetric analysis usually only provides for the analysis of a single element, or a limited group of elements, at a time. Comparing modern dynamic flash combustion coupled with gas chromatography  with traditional combustion analysis will show that the former is both faster and allows for simultaneous determination of multiple elements while traditional determination allowed only for the determination of carbon and hydrogen. Methods are often convoluted and a slight mis-step in a procedure can often mean disaster for the analysis (colloid formation in precipitation gravimetry, for example). Compare this with hardy methods such as spectrophotometry and one will find that analysis by these methods is much more efficient.

Steps in a gravimetric analysis

After appropriate dissolution of the sample the following steps should be followed for successful gravimetric procedure:

1. Preparation of the Solution: This may involve several steps including adjustment of the pH of the solution in order for the precipitate to occur quantitatively and get a precipitate of desired properties, removing interferences, adjusting the volume of the sample to suit the amount of precipitating agent to be added.
 
2. Precipitation: This requires addition of a precipitating agent solution to the sample solution. Upon addition of the first drops of the precipitating agent, supersaturation occurs, then nucleation starts to occur where every few molecules of precipitate aggregate together forming a nucleus. At this point, addition of extra precipitating agent will either form new nuclei or will build up on existing nuclei to give a precipitate. This can be predicted by Von Weimarn ratio where, according to this relation  the particle size is inversely proportional to a quantity called the relative supersaturation where
 
Relative supersaturation = (Q – S)/S
 
The Q is the concentration of reactants before precipitation, S is the solubility of precipitate in the medium from which it is being precipitated. Therefore, to get particle growth instead of further nucleation we must make the relative supersaturation ratio as small as possible. The optimum conditions for precipitation which make the supersaturation low are:
 
a.   Precipitation using dilute solutions to decrease Q
b.   Slow addition of precipitating agent to keep Q as low as possible
c.   Stirring the solution during addition of precipitating agent to avoid concentration sites and keep Q low
d.   Increase solubility by precipitation from hot solution
e.   Adjust the pH to increase S, but not too much increase np as we do not want to lose precipitate by dissolution
f.   Usually add a little excess of the precipitating agent for quantitative precipitation and check for completeness of the precipitation
 
3. Digestion of the precipitate: The precipitate is left hot (below boiling) for 30 min to one hour for the particles to be digested. Digestion involves dissolution of small particles and reprecipitation on larger ones resulting in particle growth and better precipitate characteristics. This process is called Ostwald ripening. An important advantage of digestion is observed for colloidal precipitates where large amounts of adsorbed ions cover the huge area of the precipitate. Digestion forces the small colloidal particles to agglomerate which decreases their surface area and thus adsorption. You should know that adsorption is a major problem in gravimetry in case of colloidal precipitate since a precipitate tends to adsorb its own ions present in excess, Therefore, forming what is called a primary ion layer which attracts ions from solution forming a secondary or counter ion layer. Individual particles repel each other keeping the colloidal properties of the precipitate. Particle coagulation can be forced by either digestion or addition of a high concentration of a diverse ions strong electrolytic solution in order to shield the charges on colloidal particles and force agglomeration. Usually, coagulated particles return to the colloidal state if washed with water, a process called peptization.

4. Washing and Filtering the Precipitate: It is crucial to wash the precipitate thoroughly to remove all adsorbed species that would add to the weight of the precipitate. One should be careful nor to use too much water since part of the precipitate may be lost. Also, in case of colloidal precipitates we should not use water as a washing solution since peptization would occur. In such situations dilute nitric acid, ammonium nitrate, or dilute acetic acid may be used. Usually, it is a good practice to check for the presence of precipitating agent in the filtrate of the final washing solution. The presence of precipitating agent means that extra washing is required. Filtration should be done in appropriate sized Gooch or ignition filter paper.
 
5. Drying and Ignition: The purpose of drying (heating at about 120-150 oC in an oven) or ignition in a muffle furnace at temperatures ranging from 600 to 1200 oC is to get a material with exactly known chemical structure so that the amount of analyte can be accurately determined.

6. Precipitation from Homogeneous Solution: To make Q minimum we can, in some situations, generate the precipitating agent in the precipitation medium rather than adding it. For example, to precipitate iron as the hydroxide, we dissolve urea in the sample. Heating of the solution generates hydroxide ions from the hydrolysis of urea. Hydroxide ions are generated at all points in solution and thus there are no sites of concentration. We can also adjust the rate of urea hydrolysis and thus control the hydroxide generation rate. This type of procedure can be very advantageous in case of colloidal precipitates.

Solubility in the presence of diverse ions

As expected from previous information, diverse ions have a screening effect on dissociated ions which leads to extra dissociation. Solubility will show a clear increase in presence of diverse ions as the solubility product will increase. Look at the following example:

Find the solubility of AgCl (Ksp = 1.0 x 10−10) in 0.1 M NaNO3. The activity coefficients for silver and chloride are 0.75 and 0.76, respectively.

AgCl(s) = Ag+ + Cl−
 
We can no longer use the thermodynamic equilibrium constant (i.e. in absence of diverse ions) and we have to consider the concentration equilibrium constant or use activities instead of concentration if we use Kth:

Ksp = aAg+ aCl−
Ksp = [Ag+] fAg+ [Cl−] fCl−
1.0 x 10−10 = s x 0.75 x s x 0.76
s = 1.3 x 10−5 M
 
We have calculated the solubility of AgCl in pure water to be 1.0 x 10−5 M, if we compare this value to that obtained in presence of diverse ions we see % increase in solubility = {(1.3 x 10−5 – 1.0 x 10−5) / 1.0 x 10−5} x 100 = 30%
Therefore, once again we have an evidence for an increase in dissociation or a shift of equilibrium to right in presence of diverse ions.

References

External links
 Gravimetric Quimociac Technique

Analytical chemistry
Scientific techniques